Mercedes-Benz U.S. International (MBUSI) is a Mercedes-Benz automobile manufacturing plant near Vance, Alabama. The factory was announced in 1993 and produced its first vehicle, an ML320, in February 1997.

From its inception to 1999, the president and CEO of MBUSI was Andreas Renschler. When he was promoted to Head of Global Executive Management Development for DaimlerChrysler, he was succeeded by Bill Taylor. Since Taylor's resignation in 2009, the company has been led by Ola Kaellenius (2009-2010), Markus Schaefer (2010-2013), Jason Hoff (2013-2019), and Michael Göbel (2019-present).

Daimler announced in December 2009 that it would move production of the Mercedes-Benz C-Class to its Vance plant, with production beginning in 2014.

The plant is located on 1,000 acres of land donated by the state of Alabama.  The land was donated as part of the bid, by Alabama, to win the contract with Mercedes. The plant includes multiple test tracks, on road and off-road.

Mercedes-Benz Visitor Center
Located on the property is the Mercedes-Benz Visitor Center which includes a museum showcasing cars throughout Mercedes-Benz history. Cars within this collection are rotated out as needed.  As of November 2014 there was a Formula One car originally driven by Michael Schumacher located inside.  Guests can reserve ahead for plant tours.  Admission to the visitor's center is free. Plant tours are $5.

Current vehicles manufactured
 Mercedes-Benz GLE-Class (2016–present)
 Mercedes-Benz GLS-Class (2016–present)
 Mercedes-Benz GLE Coupe (2016–present)
 Mercedes-Maybach GLS-Class (2020–present)
 Mercedes-Benz EQS SUV (2022-present)

Former vehicles manufactured
 Mercedes-Benz C-Class (2015-2020)
 Mercedes-Benz GL-Class (2007-2015)
 Mercedes-Benz M-Class (1998-2015)
 Mercedes-Benz R-Class (2006-2015)

See also
 Germans in Alabama

References

External links
 Mercedes-Benz U.S. International (MBUSI)
 Mercedes-Benz Visitor Center
 

Industrial buildings completed in 1997
Mercedes-Benz
Motor vehicle assembly plants in Alabama
Buildings and structures in Tuscaloosa County, Alabama
Companies based in Tuscaloosa, Alabama
Tourist attractions in Tuscaloosa County, Alabama